Scoubidou is a craft, threading and knotting plastic strips and tubes. 

Scoubidou may also refer to:
 Scoubidou (song), a 1958 Sacha Distel song
 Scoubidou (tool), a corkscrew-like tool that is used for the commercial harvesting of seaweed

See also
 Scooby-Doo (disambiguation)